Konstantin Shotayevich Meladze (born 11 May 1963 in Batumi) is a Ukrainian-Russian composer and producer. He is the older brother of singer Valery Meladze and co-founder and co-producer of the Ukrainian girl group Nu Virgos.

Biography

Early life
Konstantin Meladze was born on 11 May 1963 in Batumi to Shota and Nelly Meladze, who were engineers. Konstantin has a brother, Valery (1965) and a sister, Liana (1968).

Career
Konstantin has composed and produced songs for artists such as Valery Meladze, Nu Virgos, Yin-Yang, Vera Brezhneva, Albina Dzhanabaeva, Sofia Rotaru ("Ya zhe yego lyubila" and "Odin na svete") and Polina Gagarina. He has also composed songs for a number of films, including Lilya 4-ever and a Russian 2003 version of Cinderella and Hipsters.

In 2016 and 2017 he was a judge at Vidbir, Ukraine's National Selection for the Eurovision Song Contest.

Music video appearances

Personal life
Konstantin was married to Jana Meladze in 1994; they have three children: Alice (2000), Liya (2004) and Valery (2005).

He married Ukrainian singer Vera Brezhneva in 2015.

References

External links

Performances
 Strannik (Wanderer)

1963 births
Living people
People from Batumi
Composers from Georgia (country)
Russian composers
Russian male composers
Ukrainian composers
Russian pop musicians
Russian record producers
Russian people of Georgian descent
Ukrainian pop musicians
Ukrainian people of Georgian descent
Fabrika Zvyozd
Russian National Music Award winners